Jezla (also Romanized as Jezlā and Jazlā; also known as Gizla, Jīzlā, and Kizla) is a village in Chavarzaq Rural District, Chavarzaq District, Tarom County, Zanjan Province, Iran. At the 2006 census, its population was 686, in 152 families.

References 

Populated places in Tarom County